Mearns is a Scottish surname. Notable people with the surname include:

David Mearns (born 1958), United States-born marine scientist
Edgar Alexander Mearns (1856–1916), American ornithologist and field naturalist
Frederick Mearns (1879–1931), British footballer
Ian Mearns, British Labour Party politician
Randy Mearns (born 1969), Canadian lacrosse player
Sara Mearns (born 1986), American ballet dancer
William Hughes Mearns (1875–1965), American educator and poet